Holly Lodge Girls' College   is a secondary school and sixth form for girls located in West Derby, Liverpool, England.

History

Grammar school
It was built as Holly Lodge Girls' High School on Queens Drive.

Comprehensive
In the early 1970s, the school became the Holly Lodge Comprehensive School. It is a community school administered by Liverpool City Council. The school was originally located in the Stoneycroft area of the city, however a new building was constructed in West Derby in February 2015 to replace the older Victorian and 1930s buildings.

Curriculum
Holly Lodge Girls' College offers GCSEs, BTECs and NVQs as programmes of study for pupils, while students in the sixth form have the option to study from a range of A-levels and further BTECs.

See also
 Holly Lodge High School, Smethwick

References

External links
Holly Lodge Girls' College official website

Secondary schools in Liverpool
Girls' schools in Merseyside
Community schools in Liverpool